Han Zhidong (born 29 July 1977 in Guangdong) is a male Chinese water polo player who was part of the gold medal winning team at the 2006 Asian Games. He competed  at the 2008 Summer Olympics. In 2010, as part of the china team, he competed in the 14th FINA Men's Water Polo World Cup, taking 11th place.

Competition Collapse
At the December 2006 Asian Games, Zhidong was rushed to hospital after collapsing by the poolside during a clash his team encountered. He had just got out the water when he collapsed on a team bench and was thereafter taken to the Athletes Village Medical Centre.  This incident happened with a 10-10 tie of the game.

Coaching 
Han Zhidong is currently a coach at Whitewater Swimming. A private swim club that competes in USA Swimming sanctioned meets. In addition, he is also a ASCA level 2 coach.

References

 profile
 Water Polo Federation
 

1977 births
Living people
Chinese male water polo players
Olympic water polo players of China
Sportspeople from Guangdong
Water polo players at the 2008 Summer Olympics
Asian Games medalists in water polo
Water polo players at the 1998 Asian Games
Water polo players at the 2002 Asian Games
Water polo players at the 2006 Asian Games
Water polo players at the 2010 Asian Games
Medalists at the 1998 Asian Games
Medalists at the 2002 Asian Games
Medalists at the 2006 Asian Games
Medalists at the 2010 Asian Games
Asian Games gold medalists for China
Asian Games silver medalists for China
Asian Games bronze medalists for China